Driving Home for Christmas is the twelfth studio album (and second Christmas album following The Christmas Album in 1998) released by Australian Country Musician Lee Kernaghan. The album contained 6 new songs and festive classics. The album was released in October 2014 and peaked at 46 on the ARIA Charts in November 2014.

Track listing
 "Jingle Bell Rock" - 1:58
 "Santa Claus is Back in Town" - 2:56
 "Driving Home for Christmas" - 4:09
 "O Christmas Bush" - 3:47
 "Merry Merry Christmas" - 3:00
 "Mary's Boy Child" - 3:20
 "I'll Be Home for Christmas" - 2:59
 "Three Drovers" - 2:25
 "Oh Little Town of Bethlehem" - 2:47
 "We Wish You a Merry Christmas" - 2:12
 "Christmas Waltz" - 3:28
 "Cunnamulla Santa" - 3:05
 "It Still Feels Like Christmas to Me" - 3:09

Charts

Weekly charts

Year-end charts

References 

2014 Christmas albums
2014 albums
Christmas albums by Australian artists
Country Christmas albums
Lee Kernaghan albums